Syngramma is a genus of ferns in the subfamily Pteridoideae of the family Pteridaceae. Species are native to south-east tropical Asia and the Pacific.

Species
, Plants of the World Online and the Checklist of Ferns and Lycophytes of the World recognized the following species:

Syngramma alismifolia (C.Presl) J.Sm.
Syngramma alta Copel.
Syngramma borneensis (Hook.) J.Sm.
Syngramma cartilagidens (Baker) Diels
Syngramma coriacea (Copel.) Holttum
Syngramma dayi Bedd.
Syngramma grandis (Copel.) C.Chr.
Syngramma lobbiana (Hook.) J.Sm.
Syngramma magnifica (Copel.) Holttum
Syngramma minima Holttum
Syngramma quinata (Hook.) Carruth.
Syngramma spathulata (C.Chr.) Holttum
Syngramma trichophora Holttum
Syngramma valleculata (Baker) C.Chr.
Syngramma vittiformis J.Sm. (also spelt Syngramma vittaeformis)
Syngramma wallichii (Hook.) Bedd.

References

Pteridaceae
Fern genera